The Diocese of Vibiana is a suppressed and titular see of the Roman Catholic Church in North Africa.

The current bishop is Eliseo Antonio Ariotti who was appointed 17 Jul 2003, and who replaced Angelo Palmas (1964-2003).

References

Catholic titular sees in Africa
Former Roman Catholic dioceses in Africa